The Peresadyes ( were a tribe that lived in the ancient region of Illyria and ruled over, or with the Enchelii, or the Sesarethi, and were part of the Taulantii group of tribes. About their classification they had been identified as Illyrian tribe, however, recent research has strengthened the possibility that they were Thracians.

The name itself is very close to Thracian Berisades, suggesting a possible Thracian origin. The Peresadyes also seem to have had contact with Thracians. Some historians have suggested that they weren't a distinct Illyrian tribe, but a part of the Dardani. They gave birth to what later became the Bardylis dynasty, eventually ruling the Dardanii themselves. Strabo recorded what most likely Hecataeus wrote about them, saying that they joined the dynasty of the Enchelii and the term Sesarethii is used as a synonym for Peresyades, but at the same time for Enchelii by Strabo. They ruled the area of modern Trebeništa near lake Ohrid around the 7th century BC, in Macedonia, but declined heavily by 475 BC.

See also 

 Illyrian warfare
 Thracian warfare
 List of rulers of Illyria
 List of rulers of Thrace

References

Illyrian tribes
Archaeology of Illyria
Ohrid
Ancient Macedonia